Hedya nubiferana, the marbled orchard tortrix or green budworm moth, is a moth of the family Tortricidae. It is found in the Palearctic and Nearctic realms.

The wingspan is 15–21 mm. The forewing ground colour is grey-brown.There is a square, basal black spot, and just distal to this a more or less clear, light-grey cross-band. At the wing tip there is a wide, snow-white cross-band (similar to the white uric acid in bird excrement). The hindwings are thinly shelled, light grey-brown with brown veins.

The moth flies from May to August.

The larvae feed on hawthorn (Crataegus species) and blackthorn (Prunus spinosa).

Notes
The flight season refers to Belgium and the Netherlands. This may vary in other parts of the range.

External links
 waarneming.nl 
 Lepidoptera of Belgium
 Photos at UKMoths

Olethreutinae
Tortricidae of Europe
Moths of Asia
Moths described in 1811
Taxa named by Adrian Hardy Haworth